Imperial College London (legally Imperial College of Science, Technology and Medicine) is a public research university in London, United Kingdom. Its history began with Prince Albert, consort of Queen Victoria, who developed his vision for a cultural area that included the Royal Albert Hall, Victoria & Albert Museum, Natural History Museum and royal colleges. In 1907, Imperial College was established by a royal charter, which unified the Royal College of Science, Royal School of Mines, and City and Guilds of London Institute. In 1988, the Imperial College School of Medicine was formed by merging with St Mary's Hospital Medical School. In 2004, Queen Elizabeth II opened the Imperial College Business School.

Imperial focuses exclusively on science, technology, medicine, and business. The main campus is located in South Kensington.  There is a second innovation hub campus in White City. Facilities also include teaching hospitals throughout London that with Imperial College Healthcare NHS Trust form an academic health science centre. Imperial was previously a member of the University of London and became an independent university in 2008. Imperial has a highly international community, with 59% of students from outside the UK and 140 countries represented on campus.

History

19th century 
The earliest college that led to the formation of Imperial was the Royal College of Chemistry, founded in 1845, with the support of Prince Albert and parliament.  This was merged in 1853 into what became known as the Royal School of Mines. The medical school has roots in many different schools across London, the oldest of which being Charing Cross Hospital Medical School which can be traced back to 1823, followed by teaching starting at Westminster Hospital in 1834, and St Mary's Hospital in 1851.

In 1851, the Great Exhibition was organised as an exhibition of culture and industry by Henry Cole and by Prince Albert, husband of the reigning monarch of the United Kingdom, Queen Victoria.  An enormously popular and financial success, proceeds from the Great Exhibition were designated to develop an area for cultural and scientific advancement in South Kensington. Within the next six years the Victoria and Albert Museum and Science Museum had opened, joined by new facilities in 1871 for the Royal College of Chemistry, and in 1881 the opening of the Royal School of Mines and Natural History Museum.

In 1881, the Normal School of Science was established in South Kensington under the leadership of Thomas Huxley, taking over responsibility for the teaching of the natural sciences and agriculture from the Royal School of Mines. The school was renamed the Royal College of Science by royal consent in 1890. The Central Institution of the City and Guilds of London Institute, was opened as a technical education school on Exhibition Road by the Prince of Wales in early 1885.

20th century
At the start of the 20th century, there was a concern that Britain was falling behind Germany in scientific and technical education. A departmental committee was set up at the Board of Education in 1904, to look into the future of the Royal College of Science. A report released in 1906 called for the establishment of an institution unifying the Royal College of Science and the Royal School of Mines, as well as – if an agreement could be reached with the City and Guilds of London Institute – their Central Technical College.

On 8 July 1907, Edward VII granted a Royal Charter establishing the Imperial College of Science and Technology. This incorporated the Royal School of Mines and the Royal College of Science. It also made provisions for the City and Guilds College to join once conditions regarding its governance were met, as well as for Imperial to become a college of the University of London. The college joined the University of London on 22 July 1908, with the City and Guilds College joining in 1910. The main campus of Imperial College was constructed beside the buildings of the Imperial Institute, the new building for the Royal College of Science having opened across from it in 1906, and the foundation stone for the Royal School of Mines building being laid by King Edward VII in July 1909.

As students at Imperial had to study separately for London degrees, in January 1919, students and alumni voted for a petition to make Imperial a university with its own degree awarding powers, independent of the University of London. In response, the University of London changed its regulations in 1925 so that the courses taught only at Imperial would be examined by the university, enabling students to gain a BSc.

In October 1945, George VI and Queen Elizabeth visited Imperial to commemorate the centenary of the Royal College of Chemistry, which was the oldest of the institutions that united to form Imperial College. "Commemoration Day", named after this visit, is held every October as the university's main graduation ceremony. The college also acquired a biology field station at Silwood Park near Ascot, Berkshire in 1947

Following the Second World War, there was again concern that Britain was falling behind in science – this time to the United States. The Percy Report of 1945 and Barlow Committee in 1946 called for a "British MIT"-equivalent, backed by influential scientists as politicians of the time, including Lord Cherwell, Sir Lawrence Bragg and Sir Edward Appleton. The University Grants Committee strongly opposed however, and so a compromise was reached in 1953, where Imperial would remain within the university, but double in size over the next ten years. The expansion led to a number of new buildings being erected. These included the Hill building in 1957 and the Physics building in 1960, and the completion of the East Quadrangle, built in four stages between 1959 and 1965. The building work also meant the demolition of the City and Guilds College building in 1962–63, and the Imperial Institute's building by 1967. Opposition from the Royal Fine Arts Commission and others meant that Queen's Tower was retained, with work carried out between 1966 and 1968 to make it free standing. New laboratories for biochemistry, established with the support of a £350,000 grant from the Wolfson Foundation, were opened by the Queen in 1965.

In 1988, Imperial merged with St Mary's Hospital Medical School under the Imperial College Act 1988. Amendments to the royal charter changed the formal name of the institution to The Imperial College of Science, Technology and Medicine and made St Mary's a constituent college. This was followed by mergers with the National Heart and Lung Institute in 1995 and the Charing Cross and Westminster Medical School, Royal Postgraduate Medical School and the Institute of Obstetrics and Gynaecology in 1997, with the Imperial College Act 1997 formally establishing the Imperial College School of Medicine.

21st century 
In 2003, Imperial was granted degree-awarding powers in its own right by the Privy Council. In 2004, the Imperial College Business School and a new main college entrance on Exhibition Road were opened. The UK Energy Research Centre was also established in 2004 and opened its headquarters at Imperial. On 9 December 2005, Imperial announced that it would commence negotiations to secede from the University of London. Imperial became fully independent of the University of London in July 2007.

In April 2011, Imperial and King's College London joined the UK Centre for Medical Research and Innovation as partners with a commitment of £40 million each to the project. The centre was later renamed the Francis Crick Institute and opened on 9 November 2016. It is the largest single biomedical laboratory in Europe. The college began moving into the new White City campus in 2016, with the launching of the Innovation Hub. This was followed by the opening of the Molecular Sciences Research Hub for the Department of Chemistry, officially opened by Mayor of London, Sadiq Khan in 2019.

Campuses

South Kensington 
Imperial's main campus is based in South Kensington.  Notable buildings include the Business School opened by Queen Elizabeth II, which serves as the college's main entrance, the Queen's Tower, which sits at the heart of the campus, the Royal College of Science, and the Royal School of Mines.

As part of Albertopolis, a cultural centre based on the vision of Prince Albert, the campus is adjacent many of London's most popular attractions, including Kensington Palace and the Royal Albert Hall, museums including the Natural History Museum, Victoria and Albert Museum, and Science Museum, and institutions including the Royal College of Art, the Royal College of Music, and the National Art Library. Many students take advantage of the ample green spaces that are an easy walking distance to Kensington Gardens and Hyde Park.

White City 
Imperial has a new second major campus in White City providing a platform for innovation and entrepreneurship. The hub houses research facilities, postgraduate accommodation, as well as a commercialisation space. The campus is home to the Scale Space and incubator, Invention Rooms, a college hackerspace and community outreach centre. The White City campus also includes another biomedical centre funded by Sir Michael Uren.

Silwood Park 

Silwood Park is a postgraduate campus of Imperial in the village of Sunninghill near Ascot in Berkshire. The Silwood Park campus is a centre for research and teaching in ecology, evolution, and conservation. It is set in 100 hectares of parkland used for ecological field experiments.

Hospitals 
Imperial has teaching hospitals across London which are used by the School of Medicine for undergraduate clinical teaching and medical research. All are based around college-affiliated hospitals, and also provide catering and sport facilities. College libraries are located on each campus, including the Fleming library at St Mary's.

Organisation and administration

Faculties and departments 
Imperial is organised by four faculties: the Faculty of Engineering, the Faculty of Medicine, the Faculty of Natural Sciences, and Imperial College Business School.

Faculty of Engineering
 Aeronautical Engineering
 Bioengineering
 Chemical Engineering
 Civil & Environmental Engineering
 Computing
 Dyson School of Design Engineering
 Earth Science & Engineering
 Electrical & Electronic Engineering
 Materials
 Mechanical Engineering

Faculty of Medicine
 Brain Sciences 
 Immunology & Inflammation
 Infectious Disease
 Metabolism, Digestion & Reproduction
 Surgery and Cancer
 Institute of Clinical Sciences
 National Heart and Lung Institute
 School of Public Health

Faculty of Natural Sciences
 Chemistry
 Mathematics
 Physics
 Life Sciences
 Centre for Environmental Policy

Imperial College Business School
 Analytics & Operations
 Economics & Public Policy
 Finance
 Management & Entrepreneurship
 Marketing

Interdisciplinary centres 

Imperial hosts centres to promote inter-disciplinary work under the titles of Global Challenge institutes, Imperial Centres of Excellence and Imperial Networks of Excellence. It also participates as a partner in a number of national institutes.

Global Challenge institutes:
 Data Science Institute
 Energy Futures Laboratory
 Grantham Institute for Climate Change
 Institute for Molecular Science and Engineering
 Institute for Security Science and Technology
 Institute of Global Health Innovation
 Institute of Infection

National institutes:
 Francis Crick Institute
 Rosalind Franklin Institute
 Alan Turing Institute
 Henry Royce Institute
 Faraday Institution
 UK Dementia Research Institute

Academic centres 

Imperial College also houses two academic centres, formerly the Department of Humanities, offering teaching to undergraduate and postgraduate students in modern languages, arts and humanities subjects, social sciences and other subjects which fall outside of the standard remit of science, technology and medicine. The aim of these centres is to provide training in study skills, such as the acquisition of English language proficiency, but also to encourage innovatory and interdisciplinary approaches to science, technology and medicine, which might make use of study of the arts, humanities, languages and social sciences. The academic centres are the:

 Centre for Academic English
 Centre for Languages, Culture and Communication

The Centre for Languages, Culture and Communication also operates as Imperial College London's adult education centre, offering evening class courses in the arts, humanities, languages and sciences.

Governance

The council is the governing body of Imperial.  The council consists of the Chairman, the President, the Provost, the President of Imperial College Union, 4 senior staff members, and between 9 and 13 lay advisory members (who are not employees of Imperial).

The President is the highest academic official and chief executive of Imperial College London. The position has been held by Hugh Brady, since August 2022.  The current Provost is Ian Walmsley, and the current Chair is John Allan.

Finances and endowment 

In 2020/21, Imperial had a consolidated income of £1,079.3 million. The college's endowment is sub-divided into three distinct portfolios:

 Unitised Scheme – a unit trust vehicle for the college, Faculties and Departments to invest endowments and unfettered income to produce returns for the long term
 Non-Core Property – a portfolio containing around 120 operational and developmental properties which the college has determined are not core to the academic mission
 Strategic Asset Investments – containing the college's shareholding in Imperial Innovations and other restricted equity holdings.

Affiliations and partnerships 
Imperial is a member of the Association of Commonwealth Universities, European University Association, Global Alliance of Technological Universities, League of European Research Universities and the Russell Group. It is a founding member of the Imperial College academic health sciences centre, the Francis Crick Institute and MedCity.

Imperial is a long-term partner of the Massachusetts Institute of Technology, with the first formal large-scale collaboration agreement dating back to 1944 as part of the World War II scientific effort. The two institutions still share a strong bond with exchange programs for their students and academic staff.

In the field of Mathematics, Imperial College London has a joint venture with King's College London and University College London running the London School of Geometry and Number Theory, which offers doctoral training in mathematic aspects of number theory, geometry and topology.

Academic profile

Rankings

Global
In the 2023 Times Higher Education World University Ranking, Imperial is ranked 10th in the world and 3rd in Europe.

In the 2023 Quacquarelli Symonds World University Ranking,  Imperial is ranked 6th in the world and 3rd in Europe.

In the 2022 Academic Ranking of World Universities, Imperial is ranked 23rd in the world and 6th in Europe.

Innovation
In the 2023 QS MBA Rankings for the MBA specialization of entrepreneurship, Imperial is ranked 3rd in the world and 1st in Europe.

In the 2019 Reuters World's Most Innovative Universities, Imperial is ranked 1st in innovation in the UK and 2nd in Europe.

Career prospects
In the 2019 Guardian University Guide and Complete University Guide, Imperial graduates are ranked 1st amongst UK universities in employment prospects.

A 2018 Department for Education report found that Imperial boosted female graduates earnings 31.3% above the average female graduate, and male graduates similarly saw a 25.3% increase in earnings above the average male graduate.

As of 2018, The Guardian notes that Imperial graduates pick up the highest salaries in the UK in the first year after graduation.

Research
Imperial was ranked 1st overall in rankings produced by Times Higher Education based upon the Research Excellence Framework results 2021.

In the 2021 Research Excellence Framework, 96.6% of Imperial's research is “world-leading” (66.3% achieved the highest possible 4* score) or “internationally excellent” (30.3% achieved 3*).  The REF found that 93% of Imperial's computer science research was found to be world-leading, achieving the highest possible 4* score.

The college promotes research commercialisation, partly through its dedicated technology transfer company, Imperial Innovations, which has given rise to a large number of spin-out companies based on academic research. Imperial was a critical contributor of the discovery of penicillin, and the invention of fiber optics.

The United States is the college's top collaborating foreign country, with more than 15,000 articles co-authored by Imperial and U.S.-based authors over the last ten years.   Imperial College has a long-term partnership with the Massachusetts Institute of Technology, that dates back from World War II.In January 2018, the mathematics department of Imperial and the French National Center for Scientific Research launched UMI Abraham de Moivre at Imperial, a joint research laboratory of mathematics focused on unsolved problems and bridging British and French scientific communities.  In October 2018, Imperial College launched the Imperial Cancer Research UK Center, a research collaboration that aims to find innovative ways to improve the precision of cancer treatments, inaugurated by Joe Biden as part of his Biden Cancer Initiative.

Neil Ferguson's 16 March 2020 report entitled "Impact of non-pharmaceutical interventions to reduce COVID- 19 mortality and healthcare demand" was described in a New York Times article, as the coronavirus "report that jarred the U.S. and the U.K. to action". Since 18 May, Imperial College's Dr. Samir Bhatt has been advising the state of New York for its reopening plan. The governor of New York, Andrew Cuomo, said at the time that "the Imperial College model, as we've been following this for weeks, was the best, most accurate model."

Admissions

In the academic year 2021/22, Imperial had an admissions rate of 11.1% for undergraduate admissions and 13.0% for postgraduate admissions: the ratio of applicants to admissions was 9:1 for undergraduates and 7.7:1 for postgraduates.

The undergraduate courses with the highest ratios of applicants to admissions were computing (15.8:1), mathematics (12.1:1) and mechanical engineering (8.9:1). For postgraduate, they were earth science and engineering (18.8:1), computing (15.8:1) and mechanical engineering (15.1:1).

Imperial is among the most diverse international universities in the United Kingdom, with 50% of students from the UK, 16% of students from the EU, and 34% of students from outside the UK or EU. The student body is 39% female and 61% male. 36.5% of Imperial's undergraduates are privately educated, the fourth highest proportion amongst mainstream British universities.

Libraries
The college's Central Library is located next to Queen's Lawn and contains the main corpus of the college's collection. It previously also housed the Science Museum's library until 2014. The Fleming library is located at St Mary's in Paddington, originally the library of St Mary's Hospital Medical School, with other hospital campuses also having college libraries.

Medicine

The Imperial Faculty of Medicine was formed through mergers between Imperial and the St Mary's, Charing Cross and Westminster, and Royal Postgraduate medical schools and has six teaching hospitals. It accepts more than 300 undergraduate medical students per year and has around 321 taught and 700 research full-time equivalent postgraduate students.

Imperial College Healthcare NHS Trust was formed on 1 October 2007 by the merger of Hammersmith Hospitals NHS Trust (Charing Cross Hospital, Hammersmith Hospital and Queen Charlotte's and Chelsea Hospital) and St Mary's NHS Trust (St. Mary's Hospital and Western Eye Hospital) with Imperial College London Faculty of Medicine. It is an academic health science centre and manages five hospitals: Charing Cross Hospital, Queen Charlotte's and Chelsea Hospital, Hammersmith Hospital, St Mary's Hospital, and Western Eye Hospital. The Trust is currently one of the largest in the UK and in 2012/13 had a turnover of £971.3 million, employed approximately 9,770 people and treated almost 1.2 million patients.

Other (non-academic health science centres) hospitals affiliated with Imperial College include Chelsea and Westminster Hospital, Royal Brompton Hospital, West Middlesex University Hospital, Hillingdon Hospital, Mount Vernon Hospital, Harefield Hospital, Ealing Hospital, Central Middlesex Hospital, Northwick Park Hospital, St Mark's Hospital, St Charles' Hospital and St Peter's Hospital.

Controversies

Accusations of bullying 
In 2003, it was reported that one third of female academics "believe that discrimination or bullying by managers has held back their careers". Imperial has since won the Athena SWAN Award, which recognises employment practices that are supportive of the careers of women in science, technology, engineering and maths.

In 2007, concerns were raised about the methods that were being used to fire people in the Faculty of Medicine. In 2014, Stefan Grimm, of the Department of Medicine, was found dead after being threatened with dismissal for failure to raise enough grant money. His last email before his death accused his employers of bullying by demanding that he should get grants worth at least £200,000 per year. The college announced an internal inquiry into Stefan Grimm's death, and found that the performance metrics for his position were unreasonable, with new metrics for performance being needed.

The issue of bullying within the staff at Imperial resurfaced in November 2020 when Alex Sobel, the Labour MP for Leeds North West asked the Secretary of State for Education in a written question on 24 November what steps the Office for Students had taken in response to a report by Jane McNeill QC dated 25 August which found that bullying had taken place at Imperial under the President (Alice Gast) and the Chief Financial Officer. Michelle Donelan, the Conservative MP for Chippenham, responded for the Department for Education that "The Office for Students (OfS) is considering the information it has received in relation to this matter, in line with their normal processes. As is standard practice, the OfS cannot comment on individual cases". The college was accused of a cover-up by the Universities and Colleges Union in December 2020 when it refused to publish McNeill's report, even in redacted form. The Chair of Council said that the report was kept confidential to preserve the anonymity of people who gave evidence, that its recommendations had been accepted by the senior leadership team, and that these recommendations were being implemented in full. A disciplinary panel decided that Gast's dismissal as president was not warranted and spokesperson for the college said that she had "offered wholehearted apologies to those affected".

On 14 February 2021, it was announced that the OfS would formally investigate allegations of bullying.

Student life

Student body

Imperial's male to female ratio for undergraduate students is uneven at approximately 64:36 overall and 5:1 or higher in some engineering courses. However, medicine has an approximate 1:1 ratio with biology degrees tending to be higher.

Imperial College Union
Imperial College Union is the students' union and is run by five full-time sabbatical officers elected from the student body for a tenure of one year, and a number of permanent members of staff. It is split into constituent unions aligned with the faculties of the college, carrying on the association with the original constituent colleges of Imperial, the Royal College of Science Union, City and Guilds College Union, Royal School of Mines Students' Union and Imperial College School of Medicine Students' Union.  The Union is given a large subvention by the university, much of which is spent on maintaining over 300 clubs, projects and societies. Examples of notable student groups and projects are Project Nepal which sends Imperial College students to work on educational development programmes in rural Nepal and the El Salvador Project, a construction based project in Central America. The Union also hosts sports-related clubs such as Imperial College Boat Club and Imperial College Gliding Club.

The Union operates on two sites, with most events at the Union Building on Beit Quad at South Kensington, with mostly medical school events at the Reynold's bar, Charing Cross.

Facilities 

Sports facilities at Imperial's London campuses include four gyms, including the main Ethos gym at the South Kensington Campus, two swimming pools and two sports halls. Imperial has additional sports facilities at the Heston and Harlington sports grounds.

On the South Kensington campus, there are a total of six music practice rooms which consist of upright pianos for usage by people of any grade, and grand pianos which are exclusively for people who have achieved Grade 8 or above.

There are two student bars on the South Kensington campus, one at the Imperial College Union and one at Eastside.
There are a number of pubs and bars on campus and also surrounding the campus, which become a popular social activity for Imperial's students. The Pewter tankard collection at Imperial College Union is the largest in Europe, with the majority of clubs and societies having tankards associated with their clubs.

Student media

Imperial College Radio
Imperial College Radio (ICRadio) was founded in November 1975 with the intention of broadcasting to the student halls of residence from a studio under Southside, actually commencing broadcasts in late 1976. It now broadcasts from the West Basement of Beit Quad over the internet.

Imperial College TV

Imperial College TV (ICTV) is Imperial College Union's TV station, founded in 1969 and operated from a small TV studio in the Electrical Engineering block. The department had bought an early AMPEX Type A 1-inch videotape recorder and this was used to produce an occasional short news programme which was then played to students by simply moving the VTR and a monitor into a common room. A cable link to the Southside halls of residence was laid in a tunnel under Exhibition Road in 1972. Besides the news, early productions included a film of the Queen opening what was then called College Block.

Felix Newspaper

Felix is weekly student newspaper, first released on 9 December 1949. In addition to news, Felix also carries comic strips, features, opinions, puzzles and reviews, plus reports of trips and Imperial College sporting events.

Student societies

Imperial College Boat Club

The Imperial College Boat Club is the rowing club of Imperial and was founded on 12 December 1919. The college's boat house is located in Putney on the Thames, and was recently refurbished, reopening in 2014. The club has a number of notable accolades, such as three alumni of the college in the gold medal-winning GB 8+ at the 2000 Summer Olympic Games.

Sports

Imperial College has over 60 sports clubs, of which many participate in the British Universities and Colleges Sport Association leagues such as American Football, Rugby, Badminton, Lacrosse, Football, Ice Hockey, and many others.

Exploration Club
Imperial's Exploration Board was established in 1957 to assist students with a desire for exploration. Trips have included Afghanistan, Alaska, Cameroon, Ethiopia, Fiji, the Himalayas, Iran, Morocco, Norway, Tanzania, Thailand, Ukraine, and the Yukon.

Dramatic Society

The Imperial College Dramatic Society (DramSoc) is one of two major theatrical arts societies, with the other being the Musical Theatre Society, and it was founded in 1912. The society puts on three major plays each year, in addition to several smaller fringe productions. It is additionally one of the London-based dramatic societies to participate in the London Student Drama Festival, and regularly attends the Edinburgh Fringe. DramSoc is responsible for the day-to-day maintenance of the Union's theatrical space, the Union Concert Hall.

The Techtonics

The Techtonics are an all-male a cappella group from Imperial College London, and are a part of the Imperial College A Cappella Society. The group was formed in 2008, and has since risen to prominence in the world a cappella scene. The group is best known for winning the International Championship of Collegiate A Cappella in 2016.

Student housing

Imperial College owns and manages twenty-three halls of residence in Inner London, Acton, and Ascot. Over three thousand rooms are available, guaranteeing first year undergraduates a place in College residences.

The majority of halls offer single or twin accommodation with some rooms having en suite facilities. Bedrooms are provided with basic furniture and with access to shared kitchens and bathrooms. All rooms come with internet access and access to the Imperial network. Most of them are considered among the newest student halls at London universities.

Most students in college or university accommodation are first-year undergraduates, as they are granted a room once they have selected Imperial as their firm offer with UCAS. The majority of older students and postgraduates find accommodation in the private sector, help for which is provided by the college private housing office. However a handful of students may continue to live in halls in later years if they take the position of a "hall senior", and places are available for a small number of returning students in the Evelyn Garden halls. Some students also live in International Students House, London.

Notable alumni, faculty and staff 

Nobel laureates: (medicine) Sir Alexander Fleming, Sir Ernst Boris Chain, Sir Frederick Gowland Hopkins, Sir Andrew Fielding Huxley, Rodney Robert Porter, (physics) Abdus Salam, Sir George Paget Thomson, Patrick Blackett, Baron Blackett, Dennis Gabor, Peter Higgs, (chemistry) Sir Norman Haworth, Sir Cyril Norman Hinshelwood, Sir Derek Barton, Sir Geoffrey Wilkinson, Sir George Porter.

Fields medalists: Klaus Friedrich Roth, Sir Simon Donaldson, Martin Hairer.

Academic affiliations include: Sir Tom Kibble, co-discoverer of Higgs Boson; Sir Tejinder Virdee, experimental particle physicist; Sir John Pendry, theoretical solid state physicist; Sir Christopher Kelk Ingold, physical organic chemistry pioneer; Sir William Henry Perkin, discoverer of the first synthetic organic chemical dye mauveine; Sir Edward Frankland, originator of the theory of chemical valency; Sir William Crookes, discoverer of thallium; Sir Alan Fersht, chemist; David Phillips, chemist; Harold Hopkins, contributed to the theory and design of optical instruments; Alfred North Whitehead, mathematician and philosopher; Sir Steven Cowley, physicist and president of Corpus Christi College, Oxford; and Sir John Ambrose Fleming, inventor of the vacuum tube.
In biology and medicine; Thomas Huxley, advocate of the theory of evolution; Azeem Majeed. Clinical Academic and Public Health Specialist; Wendy Barclay, virologist; Dame Sally Davies, the Chief Medical Officer for England; David Livingstone, medical missionary and Clare Lloyd, biologist.
In engineering; Chi Onwurah, politician; Dame Julia Higgins, polymer scientist; Dame Judith Hackitt, former Chair of the Health and Safety Executive; Dudley Maurice Newitt, scientific director of the Special Operations Executive; and Julia King, Baroness Brown of Cambridge, engineer and Member of the House of Lords. Narinder Singh Kapany, inventor of fibre optics.

Non-academic affiliations include: H. G. Wells, author; Nikolas Tombazis, chief car designer at McLaren and Ferrari; Ralph Robins, CEO of Rolls-Royce; Brian May, guitarist of rock band Queen; Chew Choon Seng, CEO of Singapore Airlines; Sir Julius Vogel, former Prime Minister of New Zealand; Rajiv Gandhi, former Prime Minister of India; Teo Chee Hean, Senior Minister of Singapore (formerly Deputy Prime Minister of Singapore); Edem Tengue, Minister of maritime economy of the republic of Togo; Huw Thomas, Physician to the Queen; Sir Roger Bannister, ran the first four-minute mile; David Warren, inventor of the flight data recorder and cockpit voice recorder; Andreas Mogensen, first Danish astronaut; Winston Wong, entrepreneur; Alan Howard, hedge fund manager and philanthropist; Cyrus Pallonji Mistry, former chairman of the Tata Group; Michael Birch, entrepreneur; Henry Charles Stephens, politician; Sir Michael Uren, businessman and philanthropist; Ian Read, CEO of Pfizer, Pallab Ghosh, BBC correspondent, Hannah Devlin, science journalist; Dyah Roro Esti Widya Putri, member of House of Representatives of the Republic of Indonesia.

See also 

 Albertopolis
 Armorial of UK universities
 Education in London
 List of universities in the UK

Notes

References

External links
 
 
 

 
Buildings and structures in the Royal Borough of Kensington and Chelsea
Educational institutions established in 1907
Former colleges of the University of London
Russell Group
1907 establishments in England
South Kensington
Universities in London
Universities UK